The Sigma SA-mount is a lens mount by the Sigma Corporation of Japan for use on their autofocus single-lens reflex and mirrorless cameras. It was introduced with the SA-300 in 1992. Originally, the SA-mount was a dual-bayonet mount with inner (SA-IB) and outer (SA-OB) bayonets, the latter being a feature intended to mount heavy telephoto lenses, but never utilized by Sigma and consequently dropped with the release of the SD14 in 2007.

There were two precursors to the introduction of SA-mount cameras, the manual-focus Sigma Mark-I in 1976, which still featured a M42 screw lens mount, and the SA-1 of 1983 with Pentax K-mount.

Mechanically, the (inner) SA-mount is similar to the Pentax K-mount as well, but with a flange focal distance of 44.00 mm, identical to that of the Canon EF-mount. Like the EF-mount, the SA-mount uses electrical communication between body and lens, and in fact uses the same signalling lines and protocol as the EF-mount, despite the physical incompatibility.  Sigma has long produced EF-mount lenses for Canon cameras, and thus had the ability to use this protocol.

All Sigma SLRs and DSLRs can use manual focus lenses too, which have no electrical communication between body and lens.

In September 2018, Sigma announced that they will stop the development of SA-mount cameras and focus on the Leica L-mount, as members of the L-Mount Alliance alongside Panasonic.

Compatibility 

M42-mount lenses can be mounted via adapters utilizing the SA inner bayonet.

Despite of the physical similarities Pentax K-mount (PK) lenses can't really be fitted straight onto the SA-mount as well, once the protruding AA lever and AA protector outcrop are removed, though the fit is slightly loose as the SA-mount has a slightly bigger bore than the PK-mount. However, due to the difference in registration distance scale focusing isn't possible and the close focusing capabilities will be reduced.

Utilizing the SA-OB bayonet mount (on camera bodies supporting it), Nikon F-mount can be fitted and used via a JTAT mount adapter developed by Kazuo Suzuki, Tachibana Seisakusho.

In digital cameras, it is important to make sure that the rear of an adapted lens never hits the camera's dust protector filter when focused to infinity.

Lens adaptations 
Newer lenses with Sigma SA-mount can be used on newer Sony E-mount cameras (for example, the Sony ILCE-7 series, the ILCE-5000, ILCE-6000 etc.) using the Sigma MC-11 SA-E mount adapter, introduced in 2016. (A similar Sigma MC-11 EF-E adapter is available to mount Canon EF-mount lenses on Sony E-mount cameras.) The adapters support autofocus, image stabilization and electronic aperture control.

Camera bodies

Lenses
All SLR lenses manufactured by Sigma since 1993 are available for the SA-mount. A partial listing can be found here.

See also
Kodak DCS Pro SLR/c

References

Lens mounts
Sigma Corporation